Thevar Magan is a 1992 Indian, Tamil-language action drama film written by Kamal Haasan, who also produced the film, and directed by Bharathan. It stars Haasan, Sivaji Ganesan, Revathi, Gautami and Nassar; with Kallapart Natarajan, Kaka Radhakrishnan, Sangili Murugan and Vadivelu in supporting roles. The film's story involves a respected village chieftain's son who wants to open a business but whose his father wants him to help the villagers.

The script of Thevar Magan was completed in seven days; it was written using screenwriting software called Movie Magic. Haasan said The Godfather (1972) and the Kannada film Kaadu (1973) were inspirations for the film. P. C. Sreeram was the cinematographer and N. P. Satish edited the film, which was mostly made in Pollachi, with a few days' filming at Madras and Ooty.

Thevar Magan was released on 25 October 1992 – Diwali day; it received critical acclaim and completed a 175-day run at the box office. It was chosen as India's entry for the Best Foreign Language Film for the 65th Academy Awards but was not nominated. Thevar Magan  won five National Film Awards, including Best Tamil Film, Best Supporting Actress for Revathi, and a Special Jury Award for Sivaji Ganesan, which he declined. It was later remade in Hindi as Virasat (1997) and in Kannada as Thandege Thakka Maga (2006).

Plot 
Sakthivel "Sakthi" Thevar returns home to his father Periya Thevar's village after completing his education in London. To his father's annoyance, he brings with him his westernised girlfriend Bhanumathi "Bhanu" to meet his family. Sakthi announces his plan to open a chain of restaurants in Madras, which saddens his father, who wanted his son to help local residents. Periya is a respected village chief whose younger half-brother Chinna Thevar and nephew Maya "Mayan" Thevar hold a grudge against him. The entire village suffers from this long-standing family feud. Mayan always tries to outdo Periya.

Sakthi spends time in the village with Bhanu. They find an old temple that has been closed off on Mayan's orders. Sakthi insists on entering with the help of his friend and servant Isakki. Mayan hears of this and a riot between the two village factions occurs. To quell the situation,  Periya  contemplates apologising to his opponents. Sakthi feels he or Isakki should apologise instead. When Sakthi asks for Isakki, he learns Mayan has severed Isakki's arm as punishment for opening the temple. To prevent further escalation of the situation, Sakthi, with his father's permission and with the help of his friends in the government, legally opens the temple for all.

Slighted by this, Mayan hires goons to break a dam protecting a part of the village that supports Periya. The goons use explosives to damage the dam, flooding half of the village and resulting in numerous deaths, including infants. This saddens Sakthi, who spots the goon who placed the explosives and gives chase. After capturing the goon, Sakthi hands him over to the police. The goon does not mention Mayan's involvement in fear for his own family's safety. Later, Mayan closes a portion of his land, preventing the public from easily reaching the main road. Sakthi and his father invite them for talks at the village panchayat to resolve the standoff.

In the panchayat, both sides accuse the other. With no evidence, Mayan accuses Periya of orchestrating attacks on his brother's family. Disrespected and broken, Periya  returns home and later that night dies from a heart attack. Sakthi takes over his father's duties as the village chieftain. The villagers express concern to Sakthi about having to daily circumnavigate the piece of land belonging to Mayan's side of the village, which causes a much longer travelling time. Sakthi reasons with the landowner Paramasivam to open it up for all villagers. Although understanding and willing, Paramasivam is Mayan's maternal uncle and is afraid of his nephew's backlash, especially because he has a daughter named Panchavarnam.

Sakthi assuages his fear by arranging the marriage between Panchavarnam and a wealthy villager. Everybody involved happily agrees, and Paramasivam opens up the land. On the day of the wedding, however, the groom runs away, fearing Mayan. Paramasivam and Panchavarnam are distraught, and worried if someone marries his daughter, they would live in constant fear. With her father's permission, Sakthi marries  Panchavarnam, although he still has feelings for Bhanu. Soon, Bhanu returns and learns about Sakthi's marriage. Although saddened, she understands the situation and leaves. Sakthi starts his new life with Panchavarnam.

Agitated by the land opening, Mayan plants a bomb during a festival, causing deaths on both sides of the village. Enraged, both factions go after Mayan and his family. Sakthi protects the innocent family and helps them escape from the villagers. Appreciative of Sakthi's efforts to protect them, they disclose Mayan's hiding place. Sakthi locates Mayan and asks him to surrender to the police before the villagers kill him but Mayan refuses. Mayan blames Sakthi for his problems and tries to kill him. In the ensuing struggle, Sakthi beheads Mayan. The villagers offer to take the blame for Mayan's death, but Sakthi refuses and surrenders to the police.

Cast 

 Sivaji Ganesan as Periya Thevar
 Kamal Haasan as Sakthivel Thevar (Sakthi)
 Revathi as Panchavarnam
 Gautami as Bhanumathi (Bhanu)
 Nassar as Maya Thevar[maravar] (Mayan)
 Kaka Radhakrishnan as Chinna Thevar
 Vadivelu as Isakki
 Kallapart Natarajan as Paramasivam
 Sangili Murugan as Kanakku
 Vijay as Sakthi's elder brother
 S. N. Lakshmi as Maya Thevar's mother
 Ganthimathi as Lady in temple
 Prashanthi as Sakthi's sister-in-law
 Madhan Bob as the lawyer
 Ajay Rathnam as S. Maruthupandi
 Neelima as Maya Thevar's daughter<ref>{{Cite web |last=ஆனந்தராஜ் |first=கு. |date=14 June 2017 |title=கமல் சார் கழுத்துல அருவாளை வெச்சப்போ...!{{}} நீலிமா ராணி ஃப்ளாஷ்பேக் |url=https://www.vikatan.com/news/miscellaneous/92302-tv-actress-neelima-shares-her-memories-of-acting-with-kamal |url-status=live |archive-url=https://archive.today/20200704135200/https://www.vikatan.com/news/miscellaneous/92302-tv-actress-neelima-shares-her-memories-of-acting-with-kamal |archive-date=4 July 2020 |access-date=4 July 2020 |website=Ananda Vikatan |language=ta}}</ref>

 Production 
 Development 
In the 1980s, Muktha Srinivasan planned to direct a film based on The Godfather (1972) with Sivaji Ganesan and Kamal Haasan but the project was abandoned after Haasan's associate Ananthu felt it would be a Ganesan-focused film rather than a Haasan film. Haasan later wrote a script, which eventually became Thevar Magan, in seven days, although he said he was challenged to write it in twelve. The film was initially titled Nammavar but was later renamed to its final title. Haasan also said it was inspired by The Godfather and the Kannada film Kaadu (1973). Due to his lack of experience in directing, Haasan approached Bharathan to direct Thevar Magan.

According to Haasan, Thevar Magan is the first film that was written using a screenwriting software called "Movie Magic". In 2016, Gangai Amaran said  he was supposed to direct a film titled Adhi Veerapandian starring Haasan but Amaran's brother Ilaiyaraaja advised Haasan against accepting the film, feeling Amaran was "not a good filmmaker", and the film was shelved. Amaran said; "Kamal took the story of Adhi Veerapandian and remade it as Thevar Magan". P. C. Sreeram was the cinematographer and N. P. Satish edited the film. Tirru worked as Sreeram's assistant and actor Tinku worked as assistant photographer.

 Casting 
According to Haasan, casting was done "against everyone else's suggestion". In portraying Sakthi, Haasan wore colourful, buttoned-up shirts and jeans, and a medium-size beard and a mullet in the first half of the film. He grew a thick handlebar moustache and wore  of village dhoti for the part of village head. The unit had originally wanted to cast either Vijayakumar or S. S. Rajendran for the character Periya Thevar but Haasan approached Sivaji Ganesan, who completed his scenes within seven days. Haasan persuaded Ganesan because it was his long-time desire to act in at least one film with him; Ganesan, who had retired from acting, agreed. Haasan described Thevar Magan as a "love story about Sivaji and me. I wanted to become him and he allowed me to become him".

Meena was approached to play the character Panchavarnam; she acted for a few days but due to date issues, she was replaced by Revathi. Gautami played Sakthi's initial lover Bhanu; her voice was dubbed by K. R. Anuradha. Vadivelu, who played Isakki, said;"While shooting of Singaravelan, Kamal asked me to go to his Raaj Kamal office next morning and collect an advance payment for my role in his next film, Thevar Magan. But, I was not ready to wait until the next morning. So I went to his office the same evening after the shoot" and received a cheque for 5,000. Thalaivasal Vijay was cast as Sakthi's elder brother on Haasan's recommendation. Salim Ghouse was the initial choice for the role of the antagonist Maya Thevar which ultimately went to Nassar. Neelima portrayed Maya Thevar's daughter – it was her feature-film debut.

 Filming Thevar Magan was mostly filmed at Pollachi in 75 days, and for few days at Madras and Ooty. Some scenes were filmed at a palatial bungalow situated at Singanallur. Haasan has stated the scene in which a truck with a cargo of steel rods jutting out reverses into a car was initially written for Nayakan (1987) but could not be used there because producer Muktha Srinivasan would not let a car be damaged. Writer Kalaignanam suggested the concept of one temple having two locks, which Haasan liked and added. Some scenes were filmd at Mariamman Temple in Sulukkal, Pollachi. Nassar filmed only seven scenes, of which two are major.

 Themes and influences 
According to Haasan, Thevar Magan was inspired by The Godfather and Kaadu; journalist S. Shiva Kumar said he re-used The Godfathers "crucial emotional core of a reluctant son ascending a throne full of thorns". Baradwaj Rangan said Haasan's screenplay "uses small gestures to say a lot between the lines, without explaining everything in tiresome detail", and that Bhanu is frequently shown boarding and alighting from trains, establishing her status as an outsider.

 Soundtrack 
Ilaiyaraaja composed the soundtrack of Thevar Magan and the lyrics were written by Vaali. It was released under the label AVM Audio. Embar Kannan performed the violin portions. The soundtrack has eight tracks with two alternatives. Haasan's six-year-old daughter Shruti made her singing debut with this film, singing one version of "Potri Paadadi Penne";  T. K. S. Kalaivanan and Mano sang the other version. "Inji Iduppazhagi" is based on the Hindi song "Yeh Dil Deewana", which was  composed by S. D. Burman for Ishq Par Zor Nahin (1970). Haasan wanted Ilaiyaraaja to compose on the lines of the Hindi song; Ilaiyaraaja completed the song within 10 minutes. Haasan credited Gangai Amaran for the idea of "Sandhu Pottu", which was initially intended for Adhi Veerapandian. "Manamagale Manamagale" is set in the Carnatic raga known as Shuddha Saveri, "Maasaru Ponne" is set in Mayamalavagowla, and "Inji Iduppazhagi" is set in Jaunpuri. It was later remixed by Smita for her album Kalakkal. The original song was re-used in Size Zero (2015).

 Release Thevar Magan was released on 25 October 1992, Diwali day. The film was dubbed in Telugu as Kshatriya Putrudu. The film became controversial for identifying the Thevar community with glorified violence, and faced competition from other Diwali releases Pandian, Rasukutty, Senthamizh Paattu, Kaviya Thalaivan, Thirumathi Palanisamy, Thai Mozhi and Mangala Nayagan. Despite these, Thevar Magan was commercially successful and ran for 175 days, becoming a silver jubilee film. Dilip Kumar attended the film's silver-jubilee celebration. No print of Thevar Magan has survived but the film is available on home video.

 Reception Thevar Magan received critical acclaim. On 25 October 1992, The Indian Express said; "The formidable combination of Kamal Haasan and Sivaji Ganesan, the directorial talent of Bharathan, excellent cinematography of P. C. Sriram and music by the maestro [Ilaiyaraaja], have all gone into producing Thevar Magan". The Tamil magazine Ananda Vikatan in its review dated 8 November 1992 appreciated the film and said its naturalism is greatly enhanced by the giving of equal opportunity to all actors in the film. It rated the film 60 out of 100. K. Vijiyan of New Sunday Times wrote "Devar Magan proved a satisfying experience at the cinema and well worth the wait". C. R. K. of Kalki praised the film for perfectly concentrating on character design, natural dialogues and the screenplay that carries these elements.

 Accolades Thevar Magan was chosen as India's entry for the Best Foreign Language Film for the 65th Academy Awards but was not nominated. The film was screened at the Toronto International Film Festival in 1994. Ilaiyaraaja was a strong contender for the National Film Award for Best Music Direction, which he lost to A. R. Rahman for Roja; the award was tied with eight votes each for Ilaiyaraaja and Rahman before the chairman of the jury Balu Mahendra voted in favour of Rahman. Ganesan had been awarded the Special Jury Award – Actor in the same ceremony but he refused to accept the award. Haasan claimed he convinced Ganesan not to accept it.

 Remakes 
Haasan initially planned to remake Thevar Magan in Hindi with Dilip Kumar in Ganesan's role but according to Haasan, Kumar found the theme "too violent" and refused the offer. Priyadarshan directed the Hindi remake Virasat (1997).  S. Mahendar also remade Thevar Magan in Kannada as Thandege Thakka Maga (2006).

 Legacy Thevar Magan attained cult status in Tamil cinema. Rajan Krishnan, PhD scholar in film studies at Columbia University, said; "it was Kamal Hassan who brought that sickle bearing genre", and that "Thevar Magan ... inaugurated the era of the south being represented as primarily a sickle bearing space". Stalin Rajangam, who has extensively written on the caste component and narrative structures of Tamil films, said; "Thevar Magan was first of its kind with stronger idioms of caste and glorification of caste-based practices". Tamil writer S. Ramakrishnan said Thevar Magan captured "the very essence of the south Tamil Nadu's rural culture". Vadivelu called the film a "turning point" in his career.

Directors N. Lingusamy, Mysskin, Gautham Vasudev Menon, and S. J. Suryah called Thevar Magan one of their favourite films. Gauthami also listed it as her one of her favourite films. Sify, in its review of Sandakozhi (2005), compared Rajkiran's character with Ganesan's character in Thevar Magan. The July 2010 edition of magazine South Scope included Haasan's performance in '''Thevar Magan in its list of "Kamal's best performances". Silverscreen in its review of Vetrivel (2016) called the film "pretty much an unsophisticated copy of Thevar Magan".

In 2013, The Hindu listed the song "Potri Paadadi" among lyricist Vaali's songs in the list "Best of Vaali: From 1964 – 2013". Rediff listed the same song alongside "Madhavi Pon Mayilaal" from Iru Malargal (1967) and "Andha Naal Gnabagam" from Uyarndha Manithan (1968).

On Haasan's birthday, 7 November 2015, Latha Srinivasan of Daily News and Analysis considered Thevar Magan to be one of the "films you must watch to grasp the breadth of Kamal Haasan's repertoire". Behindwoods included the scene in which Kamal's character takes over his father's duty as village head in its lists "Top 20 Mass Scenes" and "10 Mass Interval Blocks".

See also 
 List of submissions to the 65th Academy Awards for Best Foreign Language Film
 List of Indian submissions for the Academy Award for Best Foreign Language Film

Notes

References

Bibliography

External links 
 

1990s Tamil-language films
1992 drama films
1992 films
Best Tamil Feature Film National Film Award winners
Films directed by Bharathan
Films featuring a Best Supporting Actress National Film Award-winning performance
Films about feuds
Films scored by Ilaiyaraaja
Films set in Tamil Nadu
Films shot in Ooty
Films shot in Tamil Nadu
Films that won the Best Audiography National Film Award
Films with screenplays by Kamal Haasan
Indian drama films
Tamil films remade in other languages